Kelsay was an Indian scout serving in the United States Army during the Indian Wars who received the Medal of Honor for bravery.

Biography
Kelsay was born in Arizona and after entering the army served as a scout in the Indian Wars. He received the Medal of Honor for "engagements with Apaches".

Medal of Honor citation
Rank and organization: Indian Scouts. Place and date: Winter of 1872–73. Entered service at:------. Birth: Arizona. Date of issue: 12 April 1875.

Citation:

Gallant conduct during campaigns and engagements with Apaches.

See also

List of Medal of Honor recipients for the Indian Wars

References

External links

Year of birth missing
Year of death missing
United States Army Medal of Honor recipients
United States Army soldiers
People from Arizona
American military personnel of the Indian Wars
United States Army Indian Scouts
American Indian Wars recipients of the Medal of Honor
19th-century Native Americans